Lagos University Teaching Hospital (LUTH)  is a tertiary hospital established in 1961 and is located in Idi-Araba, Surulere, Lagos State, the administrative division of Nigeria. The teaching hospital affiliated with the University of Lagos College of Medicine established in 1962. The University of Lagos College of Medicine educates students and LUTH provides them with experience through placement and work experience.

Description

 the director of the hospital or Chief Medical Director is Professor Chris Bode.

Locations

There are four locations of LUTH located through Lagos State. The main campus is located in Idi-Arabia, with the supplementary and specialist clinics located elsewhere. 
The locations of LUTH are as follows:
 LUTH Main Campus, Idi-Araba
 LUTH Dermatology Clinic, Yaba
 LUTH PHC, Pakoto, Ogun State
 LUTH Psychiatry Clinic, Yaba

Departments

LUTH has eight major departments. Within these departments, there are sub-departments and specialist units. The main departments are:
 Dentistry
 Internal medicine
 Obstetrics and Gynaecology
 Laboratory medicine
 Paediatrics
 Oncology
 Surgery
 Allied Services

Description

LUTH is the largest teaching hospital in Nigeria with 761 beds. It serves about 25 million people in Lagos State. The teaching hospital trains students in the College of Medicine at the University of Lagos in the Medical, Dental, Pharmacology and other departments.

Facilities and Units

Intensive Care Unit (ICU)

One of the main facilities within the Lagos University Teaching Hospital is the ICU unit which was established on September 1963. The unit serves as the first line of care for patients with serious to life-threatening conditions or injuries. It is a 10-bedded compact unit. This number has significantly grown since a study conducted between 1963 and 1973 where the teaching hospital had constantly fluctuating and low numbers due to high staff turnover. Some of the most common conditions entering the ICU unit include severe tetanus, neurological conditions, burn injuries, and obstetric conditions.

Neonatal Unit
The Neonatal Unit is located within the department of Paediatrics in LUTH. It has a capacity of 80 newborns. On the average, the neonatal unit takes the delivery of about 2500 deliveries per year. The unit also has a referral rate of 200 per month for cases beyond the capabilities at LUTH. The Neonatal unit has two postnatal wards and a labour ward with fourteen rooms and two theaters. Within the postnatal ward, there are two sections, the inborn section for babies born within LUTH and the outborn ward for babies transferred in. Both sub-wards have a capacity to accommodate 40 babies. The neonatal facility also has a section dedicated to assisting women who are looking for the fruit of the womb. Helping with (conception).

The equipment available on the neonatal unit are incubators, phototherapy devices; including Bilirubinometer and Irradiometer machines, multiparameter monitors, pulse oximeters, apnoea monitors, piped air/oxygen, blood gas analysers, and bubble CPAP machine with blenders and high flow facility.
The Neonatal unit also has access to pharmaceuticals, microbiology facilities and a chemistry laboratory, social welfare facilities and pathology for blood examination.

The staff composition at the neonatal unit is made up of consultant neonatologists, doctors, internal house officers, nurses and other support staff. As of 2020 there are 4 neonatologists, 10 resident doctors, 26 nurses and 8 support staff.

Delivery Admission Rates (2018)

NSIA-LUTH Cancer Treatment Centre
In 2015 the Cancer Treatment Centre located in the Oncology and Radiotherapy department underwent renovations to improve the facility. According to the US Trade and Development Agency (USDTA), there are 115,000 new cancer patients known to medical services requiring treatment in Nigeria every year. Cancer Aware Nigeria oversaw the project to improve LUTH's equipment and reopened the facility in December 2015. The project was in partnership with the Nigeria Sovereign Investment Authority (NSIA). It cost approximately US$11 million. The refurbishment of the treatment centre was designed to improve the unit centred on renovating patient care rooms, waiting areas and the overall appearance of the clinic. This was done to increase the number of patients using the clinic, as well as their experience. The project had six major aims. These were to provide “internal and external radiotherapy services”, service over 3000 patients, provide the facilities to train extra staff, improve the waiting time to receive treatment, helpt to fund the development of LUTH and finally reduce the number of patients having to travel overseas to find medical attention.

President Muhammad Buhari, who commissioned the refurbishment of the Cancer Treatment Centre commented on 9 February 2019; “Today’s commissioning, is in part, the fulfilment of our commitment to Nigerians for quality, affordable and accessible healthcare”. CEO of NSIA also remarked that the Cancer Treatment Centre would service LUTH by improving “economic potential of healthcare investments in Nigeria” and it would “increase private sector participation”.

USTDA was also involved in the process of improving the Cancer treatment Centre. USDTA purchased Varian cancer treatment and detection software such as the Halcyon. This software was designed to “improve patient capacity and treatment precision”. The software also was designed to reduce the use of water and electricity by half through its precision. The treatment centre also was re-equipped with new technology. These included three Linear Accelerators, brachytherapy machine and treatment planning systems.

The treatments that are available at the Cancer Treatment Centre are:
 Radiotherapy: External beam radiation therapy and Internal beam radiation therapy
 Chemotherapy
 Pharmacy treatments.

On 27 December 2018, representatives of The Guardian visited the Cancer Treatment Centre and were advised that equipment such as linear accelerators, brachytherapy machines, Magnetic Resonance Imaging (MRI Scanners) and CT scans were due to be installed in the centre.

History

The Commission on Post-secondary Education in Nigeria was established by the Nigerian Federal Minister of Education in April 1959 and was conducted by Sir Ashby. It was designed to “conduct an investigation into Nigeria’s needs in the field of post-school certificate and Higher education over the next twenty years”. cabinet decision determined that improvements needed to be made to Nigeria’s health and medical industry. The commission investigated how Nigeria can improve in this field, tours of communities with the intent to collect oral advice from individuals associated with the health industry were undertaken. Some of these people included employers of labour, public service commissions and Governors. The investigation concluded that “teaching staff of proper quality is the first step in any effort to train skilled manpower”.

LUTH was established to raise the experience and training of medical staff in Nigeria to raise the standard of the medical industry in general. The goal to train 100 doctors annually in medical schools in Nigeria from 1975 was established. It started in 1961 with 330 beds, and today that number has risen to 761.

Education

The partnership between the College of Medicine of the University of Lagos and Lagos University Teaching Hospital provides several degrees to medical students. The most common is the Bachelor of Science. Within this degree, students specialise in Physiotherapy, Pharmacology, Nursing, Radiography, Medical Laboratory Science, Medicine and Dentistry. LUTH offers both medicine and dentistry. Students can study in both these faculties which enables them to develop good experience. The University of Lagos College of Medicine was ranked 390 in the world in 2020 for Clinical Medicine.

Education within LUTH is divided up into different departments. These departments are:
 School of Nursing (SON)
 School of Medical and Psychiatry Social Work (SMPSW)
 Community Health Officers Training School (CHOTS)
 Federal School of Biomedical Engineering (FSBE) - ND
 School of Health Information Management (SHIM)
 School of Anaesthetic Technician (SAT)
 School of Post Basic Nursing (SPBN)
 School of Midwifery (SOM)

Harvard Global Health Research Projects

The Harvard Global Health Institute is the overarching organisation for most of the health initiatives active within the Lagos University Teaching Hospital and the wider health industry in Nigeria. Its mission is to address the most “vexing challenges in human health” by using “innovative, evidence-based, collaborative visions” in partnership with hospitals and the public health industry.

AIDS Prevention In Nigeria (APIN)
The Harvard Global Health Institute works closely with LUTH through the APIN Program, to research and investigate modern treatments for HIV/AIDS. The APIN Project is a non-governmental organisation registered with the Nigerian Corporate Affairs Commission which was initiated to research and aid the prevention of HIV/AIDS. APIN stands for AIDS Prevention Initiative in Nigeria. The initiative has been running since 2000. LUTH is a supporter of the project, participating in the health initiative to improve patient care. There is also an APIN clinic located at LUTH as a part of the teaching hospital. The Harvard School of Public Health (HSPH) helps to fund the project and the first grant of $1.7 million was donated in 2008 to fast track the results of the initiative. The project states that their mission is to “provide cutting edge, innovative and sustainable approaches to address…public health” so that Nigeria may improve “program management, service delivery, capacity building, research, strategic information and advocacy in partnership with other stakeholders”. The initiative now assists approximately a quarter of people with HIV in Nigeria and provides antiretroviral care to more than 266000 patients in 570 states in Nigeria. It now has a budget of more than $120 million and is undergoing the implementation of a partnership with the US Centres for Disease Control and Prevention.

National Institute of Health & Building Research and Innovation in Nigeria's Science (BRAINS)

The College of Medicine at the University of Lagos, in conjunction with LUTH collaborated with the National Institute of Health as well as APIN. The BRAINS program is designed to develop and revise the curriculum for those studying at the college of medicine and at LUTH. There are three main areas which are emphasised in the curriculum. These are: (1) HIV research and training, (2) Community medicine and education of public health in Nigeria and finally (3) Geonomics of infectious disease. The aim is to revise the infrastructure available to students so that education in these three areas can be improved. As of 2015 the funding for this project was US$641,000 US Dollars. The project commenced in 2015 and is ongoing.

Energy management

The 5.8MW capacity independent power plant was commissioned on 7 December 2017 to secure reliable energy to the teaching hospital. NSIA, (Nigerian Software Investment Authority) the organisation also behind the Cancer Development Centre, partnered with LUTH to organise the power plant, and it served as the main funder of the project. Tade Adeyeye, the head of business development at CET Power Project Ltd, headed the company supplying the independent power plant. He observed that to function seamlessly, the powerplant would be required. The Chief Executive officer, Managing director and member of NSIA, Uche Orji inaugurated the project. He commented that the Independent power plant would be the first of its kind in Nigeria.

“We are powering the entire LUTH community, which is a size of a village. The capacity of the plant can power a small community ensuring 24 hours supply” (Uche Orji).

The Powerplant incorporates a combination of gas technology and modern fire-fighting facilities to ensure its suitability and reliability for LUTH. The implementation of the Power Plant ensures 24/7 power and energy to the hospital facility as well as the wider units. Reliable power will be especially useful for cancer treatment equipment, allowing it to fully functional at all times.

Funding Problems

SERAP Report
The Social-Economic Rights and Accountability Project (SERAP) is a non-governmental organisation established in 2004 aiming to draw attention to transgressions of human rights. It uses the UDHR to encourage the Nigerian Government to honour the basic needs and values of its citizens.

SERAP made public on 16 September 2018 that the conditions of LUTH were not per the spending allocations granted to the teaching hospital. SERAP addressed the Minister of Health, Professor Isaac Adewole asking for him to "provide information about details of actual spending of allocations to the Lagos University Teaching Hospital, (LUTH) Idi Araba and other 20 federal teaching hospitals and 20 federal medical centres across the country, for the period covering 2010 to 2017”. The letter noted that “despite huge budgetary allocations, many of the teaching hospitals and medical centres under the direct control of your Ministry have been left to fall apart and health care facilities in many of these hospitals lack even the most basic of amenities”. Further specific information regarding the condition of LUTH was provided such as the condition of amenities and infrastructure.

Flooding and Drainage Problems

As of 2018, the main entrance of LUTH was constantly suffering flooding. This issue is partly due to the lack of funds available to upgrade the entrance to protect it from the rainy season (March–July). As a result, entry to the teaching hospital is limited.

Infrastructure

Also due to insufficient funds to upgrade the building materials used at LUTH, the three-storey building suffers peeling paint, worn outdoors and roofing, and out of order amenities. However, the Accident and Emergency Unit is recently renovated and does not suffer these problems.

Over Capacity

The SERAP report also noted that there are not sufficient waiting areas to combat the overcrowding of LUTH. For example, waiting areas for mothers in the paediatric ward were not sufficient. The same problem was noted in the Gynaecology ward. Other overcrowding problems that were noted were the insufficient eonatal incubators for premature babies. Bedsheets were also noted to be in short supply.

See also

List of hospitals in Lagos
Lagos State
Hospitals in Nigeria

References

Teaching hospitals in Nigeria
University of Lagos
Hospitals in Lagos
Hospitals established in 1962
Lagos State
Nursing
Medical research institutes in Nigeria
HIV/AIDS research organisations
Pharmacology journals
Educational institutions established in 1962
1962 establishments in Nigeria
Public universities in Nigeria
Business schools in Lagos
Medical schools in Nigeria
Healthcare in Lagos
Cancer in Nigeria